Takella. N. Sadalakshmi (1928–2004) was the first Dalit woman legislator of Telangana.

Early life
Sadalakshmi was born at Pensionpura in Hyderabad. She studied at Keyes High School and had begun a course in medicine in Madras when she heard B. R. Ambedkar deliver a speech at Jeera Compound. She decided then to abandon medicine in favour of politics.

Political career
Sadalakshmi was first elected from the Peddapalli constituency and subsequently from that of Kamareddy. She rose to become deputy speaker of the Andhra Pradesh Legislative Assembly.

In 1962, Sadalakshmi was elected to the state assembly from Yellareddy assembly constituency. She became the first and only woman minister in the cabinet of Neelam Sanjiva Reddy. As a Minister of Religious and Charitable Endowments – a position she held for a year – she took the decision to train Dalits as Hindu priests. She set up an Archaka School at Yadagirigutta and allowed women into Devasthanam trusts. Later, as Social Welfare Minister, she set up SC Corporation.

Sadalakshmi was a member of Vidhan Parishad between 1974 and 1980. She also served as honorary chairman of LIDCAP in the 1980s.

Sadalakshmi supported Ambedkarism and the movement for a separate Telangana state. She joined the Telugu Desam Party in 1982 at N. T. Rama Rao's insistence and was appointed to be the party's vice-president. She later left Telugu Desam Party to work for the Telangana Congress Party.

Personal life
Sadalakshmi was married to T. Venkata Narayana, a prominent Scheduled Caste leader. They had a son and two daughters. She died on 24 July 2004 at CARE Hospital due to a cardiac problem. She was cremated at Bansilalpet.

References

1928 births
2004 deaths
Dalit women
Dalit politicians
Women members of the Andhra Pradesh Legislative Assembly
Members of the Andhra Pradesh Legislative Assembly